Weesen is a village in  See-Gaster in the canton of St. Gallen, Switzerland.

Geography

Of this area, 36.3% is used for agricultural purposes, while 51.9% is forested. Of the rest of the land, 9.1% is settled (buildings or roads) and the remainder (2.8%) is non-productive (rivers or lakes).

Coat of arms
The blazon of the municipal coat of arms is Argent a Bendlet Gules between two Lions counterpassant of the same.

Demographics
, about 11.1% of the population was made up of foreign nationals. Of the foreign population,, 31 are from Germany, 12 are from Italy, 77 are from ex-Yugoslavia, 18 are from Austria, 3 are from Turkey,  and 44 are from another country. Over the last 10 years the population has grown at a rate of 10.3%. Most of the population speaks German (92.5%), with Serbo-Croatian being second most common ( 1.8%) and Albanian being third ( 1.4%). Of the Swiss national languages, 1,315 speak German, 6 people speak French, 17 people speak Italian, and 1 person speaks Romansh.

The age distribution, in Weesen is; 167 children or 11.7% of the population are between 0 and 9 years old and 134 teenagers or 9.4% are between 10 and 19.  Of the adult population, 161 people or 11.3% of the population are between 20 and 29 years old.  233 people or 16.4% are between 30 and 39, 185 people or 13.0% are between 40 and 49, and 188 people or 13.2% are between 50 and 59.  The senior population distribution is 146 people or 10.3% of the population are between 60 and 69 years old, 142 people or 10.0% are between 70 and 79, there are 43 people or 3.0% who are between 80 and 89, and there are 23 people or 1.6% who are between 90 and 99.

 there were 216 persons (or 15.2% of the population) who were living alone in a private dwelling.  There were 360 (or 25.3%) persons who were part of a couple (married or otherwise committed) without children, and 640 (or 45.0%) who were part of a couple with children.  There were 66 (or 4.6%) people who lived in single parent home, while there are 18 persons who were adult children living with one or both parents, 2 persons who lived in a household made up of relatives, 12 who lived household made up of unrelated persons, and 108 who are either institutionalized or live in another type of collective housing.

In the 2007 federal election the most popular party was the SVP which received 36.4% of the vote.  The next three most popular parties were the CVP (21.1%), the FDP (15.5%) and the SP (12.2%).

The entire Swiss population is generally well educated.  In Weesen about 71.6% of the population (between age 25-64) have completed either non-mandatory upper secondary education or additional higher education (either University or a Fachhochschule).  Out of the total population in Weesen, the highest education level completed by 277 people (19.5% of the population) was Primary, while 525 (36.9%) have completed their secondary education, 216 (15.2%) have attended a Tertiary school, and 41 (2.9%) are not in school.  The remainder did not answer this question.

Heritage sites

The late-Roman Era castle and medieval ruins at Altweesen are listed as Swiss heritage sites of national significance.

On 28 August 1232 a document confirms an exchange of goods between members of the noble families of Kyburg and Rapperswil in the villages of Oberwesin and Niderwesin that were in the possession of Kyburg to 1264 respectively of Rapperwil to 1283, the nucleus of the monastic community "in den Wyden", a community of lay women or Beguines, which Count Rudolf IV von Rapperswil donated certain duties and lands to form the Dominikanerinnenkloster Maria Zuflucht in 1259. The Dominican nunnery is listed in the Swiss inventory of cultural property of national and regional significance as a Class B object of regional importance.

Transportation
The municipality is located on the A3 motorway.

Economy
, Weesen had an unemployment rate of 1.41%.  , there were 34 people employed in the primary economic sector and about 15 businesses involved in this sector.  55 people are employed in the secondary sector and there are 11 businesses in this sector.  311 people are employed in the tertiary sector, with 48 businesses in this sector.

 the average unemployment rate was 3.5%.  There were 75 businesses in the municipality of which 10 were involved in the secondary sector of the economy while 51 were involved in the third.

 there were 252 residents who worked in the municipality, while 445 residents worked outside Weesen and 223 people commuted into the municipality for work.

Religion

Of the rest of the population, there are 35 individuals (or about 2.46% of the population) who belong to the Orthodox Church, and there are 14 individuals (or about 0.98% of the population) who belong to another Christian church. There are 2 individuals (or about 0.14% of the population) who are Jewish, and 44 (or about 3.09% of the population) who are Islamic. There are 2 individuals (or about 0.14% of the population) who belong to another church (not listed on the census), 106 (or about 7.45% of the population) belong to no church, are agnostic or atheist, and 75 individuals (or about 5.27% of the population) did not answer the question.

Weather
Weesen has an average of 147.2 days of rain or snow per year and on average receives  of precipitation. During this month there is precipitation for an average of 14.2 days. The month with the most days of precipitation is June, with an average of 15, but with only  of rain or snow.

References

External links

 Official website 
 

Municipalities of the canton of St. Gallen
Cultural property of national significance in the canton of St. Gallen
Populated places on the Walensee